Ningqiang County is a county and both the southwesternmost and westernmost county-level division of Shaanxi province, China, bordering both Sichuan and Gansu. It is under the administration of Hanzhong City. The source of the Han River is located in the county.

Ningqiang is one of the counties with a sizable number of Qiang and Yi minorities.

As a result of the 2008 Sichuan earthquake, 500 buildings in the county collapsed and seven people were killed, making it the worst hit area in Shaanxi.

Administration
The county executive, legislature and judiciary are in Hanyuan Subdistrict; though like many shiretowns it is conventionally also known as Chengguan, together with the CPC and PSB branches.

Subdistricts
  Hanyuan Subdistrict, county seat
  Gaozhaizi Subdistrict

Towns
the County oversees sixteen other towns.

Climate

Transport 
Ningqiang is served by the Yangpingguan Railway Station (阳平关站), which marks the start of the Yangpingguan–Ankang Railway, and the Ningqiangnan Railway Station (宁强南站), which is part of the Xi'an–Chengdu high-speed railway line, opened in 2017.

The G5 Beijing-Kunming expressway and National Highway 108 both pass through Ningqiang.

References

External links
 Ningqiang County Official Website 

County-level divisions of Shaanxi
Hanzhong